Symphlebia catenata is a moth in the family Erebidae. It was described by William Schaus in 1905. It is found in Brazil and French Guiana.

References

Moths described in 1905
catenata